Bachar Zarkan (بشار زرقان: Arabic ) is a Syrian musician, singer, and actor known for his Sufi music.

Early life
Bachar Zarkan spent much of his childhood in the quarter of Bab al-Salam in Damascus. He was raised in a traditional and culturally stimulating environment characterized by popular and classical music and by religious rites of commemoration, such as 'al-Hadra' and 'al-Zikr'. When a teenager, he learned to play the ‘ud  and was already attracted by artistic crossing experiences, notably with drama. His unending quest for creation enriched itself through his stay in France (1992-1997), his visits to several European countries and to the USA.

Theatre
Bachar Zarkan's theatrical experience started, in 1986, in the parts he played as both an actor and a singer in the play "Luka' Ben Luka'" written by the Palestinian author Emile Habibi, and directed by Walid Quwwatli. The latter asked him then to compose music for the poetic works of the play. That is when Zarkan started to question the relationship between music and a drama script, to question in the end the essence of a song. This quest led him to be involved in several musical trends and experiences, including political ones. However, in the middle of the eighties, his rediscovery of mystical poetry, which was already part of his childhood memory, saved him from the dominant musical repetition, and monotony of this time.

Music for poetry
Bachar Zarkan considered then that mystical poetry answered largely his expectations, ambitions, and concerns with music. Afterwards, when he studied the Sound Theater at the Pygmalion Studio in France (1996), his major aim was to deepen his understanding of the relationship between words, music, movement and rhythm. Now, he is interested in composing music for contemporary poetic texts that match the Sufi texts in their beauty and internal rhythm as well as in their meaning, such as the poems of Mahmud Darwish and jeryoss samawi and Ahmad shahaawi and Taher Riyad.

Festival appearances 
Bachar Zarkan participated in many international and Arabic festivals:
Concert in Qasr al-Azm, Damascus, 1992
Arab Club Festival, London, 1993
Recital in Exeter, Great Britain, 1993
Recital in Bielefield, Germany, 1994
The Arab World Institute (IMA), Paris, France, 1994
UNESCO Theatre, the Arab Club, New York, 1995
The International Festivals of Jerash, Jordan 1993, 1995, 2000, 2004
Abou Dhabi Festival, The Arab Emirates, 1994
Assila Festival, Morocco, 1997
The Madina Festival, Tunisia 2000,  2003
Concert in Sama Theater, Damascus, 2001
Al-Mutanabbi Festival, Switzerland (Zurich and Bern), 2005
Sufi Festival, Amman, Jordan, 2008
Mälmo Festival, Sweden 2008
Music Show, Copenhagen, Denmark, 2008
Festival The Spring of Culture, Bahrein, 2009
Jordan Festival in Amman, 2009
Literature Festival of Berlin, September 2009

Albums
Tayer La Tatyr
Haly Ant(Moi c'est Toi)
AL-Jidarih
Personne (la ahad )

References

https://web.archive.org/web/20111006022323/http://www.baladnaonline.net/ar/index.php?option=com_content&task=view&id=8234

Living people
Performers of Sufi music
21st-century Syrian male singers
Year of birth missing (living people)
20th-century Syrian male singers